Kirsty Loretta Mitchell (born 28 June 1974) is an award nominated Scottish actress, She is the Scottish voice of Mòrag Ladair in Xenoblade Chronicles 2. In 2019, she began appearing in the BBC medical drama series Casualty as ACP Faith Cadogan.

Early life
Mitchell was born in Glasgow and was a student at Park Mains High School in Erskine.  She trained as a ballet dancer before turning to acting and won the Miss Scotland title at 17 years old.

Filmography

References

External links
 

1974 births
Living people
People educated at Park Mains High School
Scottish film actresses
Actresses from Glasgow
Scottish soap opera actresses
Scottish television actresses
Scottish video game actresses
Scottish beauty pageant winners